Western Downs Region is a local government area in Queensland, Australia.

The area is home to prime farming land and thus agriculture is a major industry in the area. Dalby, the biggest town in the region is home to the second largest cattle saleyards in Australia. The Dalby Saleyards process over 200,000 cattle annually in its facility which is comparable to Rockhampton and Casino.

The Western Downs Regional Council's Corporate Office is situated at 30 Marble Street, Dalby.

History
Baranggum (also known as Barrunggam, Barunggam Parrungoom, Murrumgama) is an Australian Aboriginal language spoken by the Baranggum people. The Baranggum language region includes the landscape within the local government boundaries of the Western Downs Regional Council, particularly Dalby, Tara, Jandowae and west towards Chinchilla.

Western Downs Region was created in March 2008 as a result of the report of the Local Government Reform Commission released in July 2007.

Prior to the 2008 amalgamation, the new Region, located in the Darling Downs region, consisted the entire area of five previous local government areas:

 the Town of Dalby;
 the Shire of Chinchilla;
 the Shire of Murilla;
 the Shire of Tara;
 the Shire of Wambo;
 and Division 2 of the Shire of Taroom.

The report recommended that the new local government area should not be divided into wards and elect ten councillors and a mayor.  The report estimated that the resident population in 2006 was 30,018 and the operating budget was A$74 million.

Originally called Dalby Region, a name change to Western Downs was approved in August 2009. The name change was greeted positively by residents as they felt the name was more inclusive and a better representation of the area. The name "Western Downs" stems from the phrase Darling Downs, and as the name suggests; the area to the west of the downs.

Towns and localities
The Western Downs Region includes the following settlements:

Dalby area:
 Dalby (town)
Chinchilla area:
 Boonarga
 Brigalow (town)
 Canaga
 Chances Plain
 Chinchilla (town)
 Crossroads
 Goombi
 Hopeland
 Kogan (town)
 Rywung
 Wychie
Murilla area:
 Columboola
 Condamine (town)
 Dalwogon
 Drillham (town)
 Dulacca (town)
 Gurulmundi
 Kowguran
 Miles (town)
 Barramornie
 Bogandilla
 Drillham South
 Glenaubyn
 Hookswood
 Moraby
 Myall Park
 Nangram
 Pine Hills
 Sunnyside
 Yulabilla

Tara area:
 Flinton
 Glenmorgan (town)
 Goranba
 Hannaford
 Inglestone
 Meandarra
 Moonie (town)
 Tara (town)
 The Gums (town)
 Weranga
 Westmar
Wambo area:
 Bell (town)
 Burra Burri
 Cooranga
 Ducklo
 Irvingdale
 Jandowae (town)
 Jimbour (town)
 Jimbour East
 Jimbour West
 Kaimkillenbun (town)
 Kumbarilla
 Macalister
 Mowbullan
 Nandi
 Pirrinuan
 Roche Creek
 St Ruth
 Tuckerang
 Warra (town)
South Taroom area:
 Eurombah1
 Grosmont
 Guluguba
 Wandoan (town)

1 - shared with the Shire of Banana

Libraries 
The Western Downs Regional Council operates public libraries at Bell, Chinchilla, Dalby, Jandowae, Meandarra, Miles, Moonie, Tara, and Wandoan.

Population

 * - shared with the Shire of Banana

Mayors and councillors

Mayors 

 2008–2016 : Ray Brown* 
 2016–present : Paul McVeigh

Councillors

2016 
The councillors elected in 2016 were:
 Andrew Smith* (2008–present)
 Carolyn Tillman* (2008–present)
 Greg Olm (2012–present)
 Ian Rasmussen (2012–present)
 Peter Saxelby (2016–present)
 Kaye Maguire (2016–present)
 Donna Ashurst (2016–present)
*was representative of a region pre-amalgamation

References

External links

 Western Downs Regional Council
 Advance Western Downs

 
Local government areas of Queensland
Darling Downs
2008 establishments in Australia